The four corners is a quadripoint near 60° N 102° W where four Canadian provinces or territories meet. These are the provinces of Manitoba and Saskatchewan and the territories of the Northwest Territories and Nunavut. It came into being with the creation of Nunavut on April 1, 1999.

Geography
The four corners area is located between Kasba Lake to the north and Hasbala Lake to the south. It is located by an area of marginal taiga forest, which happens to be the only place in Nunavut which is not Arctic tundra or ice cap. It is hundreds of kilometres from any road or railway, but can be accessed from nearby Kasba Lake Airport/Water Aerodrome as well as from Points North Landing near Wollaston Lake.

During the winter of 1961–1962 (37 years prior the formation of Nunavut), a survey crew led by Lionel E. Boutiler installed 85 survey monuments along the northernmost section of the Saskatchewan–Manitoba border.  The crew worked from south to north along the Second Meridian as defined in the system of Dominion Land Surveys.  The final monument, designated  157, officially marked the intersection of the boundaries of Manitoba, Saskatchewan and the Northwest Territories.  Unlike the standard survey monuments along the provincial and territorial borders, Monument 157 is an aluminum obelisk that stands about one metre tall.  Photos can be seen in the original survey report.  On the top of the monument is a cap that states "5 years imprisonment for removal".

This places it roughly 421 metres west of 102° W and roughly 63 metres south of 60°N. Elevation is 347.9 metres.

The establishment of Nunavut in 1999 led to the creation of Canada's only quadripoint. In the legal definition of Nunavut, its border is specified as "Commencing at the intersection of 60°00′ N latitude with 102°00′ W longitude, being the intersection of the Manitoba, Northwest Territories and Saskatchewan borders". Since the intersection does not lie exactly at those coordinates, the laws left a legal ambiguity regarding the exact commencement point of the boundary.

In 2014 the Survey General Branch of Natural Resources Canada acknowledged there was a problem with the legal boundary definition; it decided that the boundary should commence at Monument 157.
Specifically it decided that the first leg of the boundary should be a 472 km geodesic line running from Monument 157 to the first turning point at 64°14′N 102°00′W(NAD27).
This decision confirmed that in the eyes of Natural Resources Canada, the two territories and two provinces do indeed meet at a quadripoint.

In September 2014 the federal government paid for an official survey of the 472 km line. The survey crew, following instructions from the SGB installed 48 new Canada Lands survey monuments along the geodesic line. As of 2021, the ambiguous legislation has not been repealed or updated to acknowledge the existence of the surveyed boundary, but based on legal precedent from the Dominion Land Survey, the surveyed boundary legally prevails over the  description of the boundary in the original legislation.

Gallery

See also

 Geography of Canada
 List of regions of Canada
 Four Corners Monument, a surveyed quadripoint in the United States which also has a monument.

References

External links

Geography of Canada
Borders of Nunavut
Borders of the Northwest Territories
Borders of Saskatchewan
Borders of Manitoba
Quadripoints and higher